Cristaphyes is a genus of worms belonging to the family Pycnophyidae.

The genus has cosmopolitan distribution.

Species:

Cristaphyes abyssorum 
Cristaphyes anomalus 
Cristaphyes arctous 
Cristaphyes belizensis 
Cristaphyes carinatus 
Cristaphyes chilensis 
Cristaphyes chukchiensis 
Cristaphyes cornifrons 
Cristaphyes cristatus 
Cristaphyes cryopygus 
Cristaphyes dordaidelosensis 
Cristaphyes fortis 
Cristaphyes furugelmi 
Cristaphyes glaurung 
Cristaphyes harrisoni 
Cristaphyes longicornis 
Cristaphyes nubilis 
Cristaphyes odhneri 
Cristaphyes panamensis 
Cristaphyes phyllotropis 
Cristaphyes rabaulensis 
Cristaphyes retractilis 
Cristaphyes scatha 
Cristaphyes spinosus 
Cristaphyes yushini

References

Kinorhyncha